Oscar Reed (born March 24, 1944) is a former professional American football running back who played for the Minnesota Vikings and Atlanta Falcons.  Reed played in Super Bowl IV, Super Bowl VIII, and Super Bowl IX. He played college football at Colorado State and was inducted into the Colorado State University Athletics Hall of Fame in 1993.

References

1944 births
Living people
American football running backs
Minnesota Vikings players
Atlanta Falcons players
Colorado State Rams football players
People from Jonestown, Mississippi